Abdul Wahid Hussain is a retired Maldivian professional footballer.

Career
Wahid played for Eydhafushi Z.J. and Club Lagoons during his football career.

International
Hungarian coach Temesvári Miklós included Wahid in his plans for the 1991 South Asian Games football event, making him the first player to get called up for national team from outside capital Malé. He made his debut in the games and also played in the starting of the final match.

Honours

Eydhafushi
Second Division: 1985; Runner-up 1984

Maldives
South Asian Games
Silver:1991

References

External links
 ދަނޑެއް ލިބިއްޖެ ނަމަ ދެ އަހަރު ތެރޭ ގައުމީ ޓީމަށް ހަތް ކުޅުންތެރިން ނެރެދޭނަން – ވާހިދު at Eydhafushi Voice
 ރަންތަރިންގެ ހަނދާންތަކާއެކު ބޮޑުމެޗަށް އޭދަފުށި ފައްކާވެއްޖެ at Eydhafushi Voice

Living people
Maldivian footballers
Association football defenders
Maldives international footballers
South Asian Games medalists in football
1966 births